The Warrumbungle Shire is a local government area in the central western region of New South Wales, Australia. The Shire is traversed by the Newell Highway. The Warrumbungle mountain range and Warrumbungles National Park are major tourist attractions for the Shire. Its capital is Coonabarabran, a city in the southwest.

The mayor of Warrumbungle Shire Council is Cr. Denis Todd, who is unaligned with any political party.

Main towns and villages
The Shire incorporates the towns of Binnaway, Coolah, Coonabarabran, Dunedoo, Baradine and Mendooran.

Heritage listings
The Warrumbungle Shire has a number of heritage-listed sites, including:
 Coolah, 74 Binnia Street: Old Police Station and Courthouse
 Coonabarabran, Oxley Highway: Burra Bee Dee Mission
 Dunedoo, Wallerawang-Gwabegar railway: Dunedoo railway station
 Kenebri, Old Wooleybah Road: Wooleybah Sawmill and Settlement

Demographics

Council
The Shire was created in 2004 by the amalgamation of Coolah and Coonabarabran Shire councils. Following amalgamation, the Shire was run by an administrator, until elections were held in March 2005.

Current composition and election method
Warrumbungle Shire Council is composed of nine councillors elected proportionally as a single ward. All councillors are elected for a fixed four-year term of office. The most recent election was held on 10 September 2016, and the makeup of the council is as follows:

The current Council, elected in 2016, alphabetically, is:

The mayor is elected by the councillors every two years. At the last mayoral election held 20 September 2018, Cr Todd was elected as mayor and Cr Iannuzzi elected as deputy mayor.

See also

List of local government areas in New South Wales

References

 
Local government areas of New South Wales
Newell Highway